SM Town Live '10 World Tour was the 2010–11 worldwide live concert tour by SM Town. The tour commenced with one show in Seoul in August 2010 and continued on to the United States, Japan, China and France.

Background
SM Town is the name for the artists under the Korean record label SM Entertainment. Each year the company organizes its artists to come together and perform on a four to six hours long concert that tours around the world.

Concerts
The first concert in Seoul reportedly lasted for six hours and featured 80 songs by various SM artists, as well as performances by the actors Kim Min-jong, Go Ara and Lee Yeon-hee. The Shanghai concert on  11 September 2010 was played to an audience of 25,000 people including performances of 54 songs. It also included a celebration for Kangta's 15th anniversary in the music industry, with a special video of his past activities.

The concert at Staples Center in Los Angeles was attended by 15,000 fans. SM Entertainment hired the 3D movie production specialist Cameron Pace Group (a James Cameron company), which brought in the popular live music director Keith Hobelman to capture the evening's performance. The show was shown in theaters in 3D and there was also a Blu-ray DVD format made for retail. It was placed at #10 on the US Billboard Boxcore chart, with ticket sales at over USD $1 million. It was the first time that Asian artists charted in the top 10.

The first two-day Tokyo concert at Yoyogi National Stadium attracted an audience of 24,000. The second leg of the concert in Tokyo was originally scheduled for 9 and 10 April but was postponed until September, out of respect after the 2011 Tōhoku earthquake and tsunami in March.

Performers

Set list

Tour dates

Media
DVD
 SM Town Live in Tokyo Special Edition (2011)

Film
 I AM. - SM Town Live World Tour in Madison Square Garden (10 May 2012 but postponed to 21 June 2012, due to audio issues)

Television
 SM Town Live in Tokyo on MBC 9 April 2012 for 90-minute, featured backstage interviews.

References

External links 

 SM Town Official homepage 

10
2010 concert tours
2011 concert tours
K-pop concerts